Old Forge Pond is located by Old Forge, New York. Fish species present in the lake are white sucker, black bullhead, rainbow trout, yellow perch, and rock bass. Carry down off NY-28 in Old Forge.

References

Lakes of New York (state)
Lakes of Herkimer County, New York